The Nazi Party, officially the National Socialist German Workers' Party ( or NSDAP), was a far-right political party in Germany active between 1920 and 1945 that created and supported the ideology of Nazism. Its precursor, the German Workers' Party (DAP), existed from 1919 to 1920. The Nazi Party emerged from the extremist German nationalist, racist and populist  paramilitary culture, which fought against the communist uprisings in post–World War I Germany. The party was created to draw workers away from communism and into  nationalism. Initially, Nazi political strategy focused on anti–big business, anti-bourgeois, and anti-capitalist rhetoric, which was later downplayed to gain the support of business leaders. By the 1930s, the party's main focus shifted to antisemitic and anti-Marxist themes. The party had little popular support until the Great Depression, where worsening living standards and vast unemployment drove Germans into political extremism.

Central to Nazism were themes of racial segregation expressed in the idea of a "people's community". The party aimed to unite "racially desirable" Germans as national comrades, while excluding those deemed to be either political dissidents, physically or intellectually inferior, or of a foreign race. The Nazis sought to strengthen the Germanic people, the "Aryan master race", through racial purity and eugenics, broad social welfare programs, and a collective subordination of individual rights, which could be sacrificed for the good of the state on behalf of the people. To protect the supposed purity and strength of the Aryan race, the Nazis sought to disenfranchise, segregate, and eventually exterminate Jews, Romani, Poles, Slavs, black people, the physically and mentally disabled, homosexuals,  Jehovah's Witnesses, and political opponents. The persecution reached its climax when the party-controlled German state set in motion the Final Solution – an industrial system of genocide that carried out the mass murders of around 6 million Jews and millions of other targeted victims  in what has become known as the Holocaust.

Adolf Hitler, the party's leader since 1921, was appointed Chancellor of Germany by President Paul von Hindenburg on 30 January 1933, and quickly seized power afterwards. Hitler established a totalitarian regime known as the Third Reich with himself in absolute power. Following the military defeat of Germany in World War II, the party was declared illegal, and German society was purged of Nazi elements in a process known as denazification. Several top leaders were tried and found guilty of crimes against humanity in the Nuremberg trials and executed. The use of symbols associated with the party is outlawed in many European countries, including Germany and Austria.



Name 
The term  (party member) was commonly used among Nazis, with its corresponding feminine form .

The term was in use before the rise of the party as a colloquial and derogatory word for a backward peasant, an awkward and clumsy person. It derived from Ignaz, a shortened version of Ignatius, which was a common name in the Nazis' home region of Bavaria. Opponents seized on this, and the long-existing , to attach a dismissive nickname to the National Socialists.

In 1933, when Adolf Hitler assumed power in the German government, the usage of "Nazi" diminished in Germany, although Austrian anti-Nazis continued to use the term, and the use of "Nazi Germany" and "Nazi regime" was popularised by anti-Nazis and German exiles abroad. Thereafter, the term spread into other languages and eventually was brought back to Germany after World War II. In English, the term is not considered slang and has such derivatives as Nazism and denazification.

History

Origins and early years: 1918–1923 
On 7 March 1918, Anton Drexler, an avid German nationalist, formed a branch of this league in Munich. Drexler was a local locksmith who had been a member of the militarist Fatherland Party during World War I and was bitterly opposed to the armistice of November 1918 and the revolutionary upheavals that followed. Drexler followed the views of militant nationalists of the day, such as opposing the Treaty of Versailles, having antisemitic, anti-monarchist and anti-Marxist views, as well as believing in the superiority of Germans whom they claimed to be part of the Aryan "master race". However, he also accused international capitalism of being a Jewish-dominated movement and denounced capitalists for war profiteering in World War I. Drexler saw the political violence and instability in Germany as the result of the Weimar Republic being out-of-touch with the masses, especially the lower classes. Drexler emphasised the need for a synthesis of  nationalism with a form of economic socialism, in order to create a popular nationalist-oriented workers' movement that could challenge the rise of Communism and internationalist politics.

Drexler's movement received attention and support from some influential figures. Supporter Dietrich Eckart, a well-to-do journalist, brought military figure Felix Graf von Bothmer, a prominent supporter of the concept of "national socialism", to address the movement. The members met periodically for discussions with themes of nationalism and racism directed against Jewish people. In December 1918, Drexler decided that a new political party should be formed, based on the political principles that he endorsed, by combining his branch of the Workers' Committee for a good Peace with the Political Workers' Circle.

On 5 January 1919, Drexler created a new political party and proposed it should be named the "German Socialist Workers' Party", but Harrer objected to the term "socialist"; so the term was removed and the party was named the German Workers' Party (DAP). To ease concerns among potential middle-class supporters, Drexler made clear that unlike Marxists the party supported the middle-class and that its socialist policy was meant to give social welfare to German citizens deemed part of the Aryan race. They became one of many völkisch movements that existed in Germany. Like other  groups, the DAP advocated the belief that through profit-sharing instead of socialisation Germany should become a unified "people's community" rather than a society divided along class and party lines. This ideology was explicitly antisemitic. As early as 1920, the party was raising money by selling a tobacco called .

From the outset, the DAP was opposed to non-nationalist political movements, especially on the left, including the Social Democratic Party of Germany (SPD) and the Communist Party of Germany (KPD). Members of the DAP saw themselves as fighting against "Bolshevism" and anyone considered a part of or aiding so-called "international Jewry". The DAP was also deeply opposed to the Treaty of Versailles. The DAP did not attempt to make itself public and meetings were kept in relative secrecy, with public speakers discussing what they thought of Germany's present state of affairs, or writing to like-minded societies in Northern Germany.

The DAP was a comparatively small group with fewer than 60 members. Nevertheless, it attracted the attention of the German authorities, who were suspicious of any organisation that appeared to have subversive tendencies. Hitler was assigned to influence other soldiers and to infiltrate the DAP. While attending a party meeting on 12 September 1919 at Munich's Sterneckerbräu, Hitler became involved in a heated argument with a visitor, Professor Baumann, who questioned the soundness of Gottfried Feder's arguments against capitalism; Baumann proposed that Bavaria should break away from Prussia and found a new South German nation with Austria. In vehemently attacking the man's arguments, Hitler made an impression on the other party members with his oratorical skills; according to Hitler, the "professor" left the hall acknowledging unequivocal defeat. Drexler encouraged him to join the DAP. On the orders of his army superiors, Hitler applied to join the party and within a week was accepted as party member 555 (the party began counting membership at 500 to give the impression they were a much larger party). Among the party's earlier members were Ernst Röhm of the Army's District Command VII; Dietrich Eckart, who has been called the spiritual father of National Socialism; then-University of Munich student Rudolf Hess;  soldier Hans Frank; and Alfred Rosenberg, often credited as the philosopher of the movement. All were later prominent in the Nazi regime.

Hitler later claimed to be the seventh party member (he was in fact the seventh executive member of the party's central committee and he would later wear the Golden Party Badge number one). Anton Drexler drafted a letter to Hitler in 1940—which was never sent—that contradicts Hitler's later claim:

Hitler's first DAP speech was held in the Hofbräukeller on 16 October 1919. He was the second speaker of the evening, and spoke to 111 people. Hitler later declared that this was when he realised he could really "make a good speech". At first, Hitler spoke only to relatively small groups, but his considerable oratory and propaganda skills were appreciated by the party leadership. With the support of Anton Drexler, Hitler became chief of propaganda for the party in early 1920. Such was the significance of this particular move in publicity that Karl Harrer resigned from the party in disagreement. It was in this speech that Hitler enunciated the twenty-five points of the German Workers' Party manifesto that had been drawn up by Drexler, Feder and himself. Through these points he gave the organisation a much bolder stratagem with a clear foreign policy (abrogation of the Treaty of Versailles, a Greater Germany, Eastern expansion and exclusion of Jews from citizenship) and among his specific points were: confiscation of war profits, abolition of unearned incomes, the State to share profits of land and land for national needs to be taken away without compensation. In general, the manifesto was antisemitic, anti-capitalist, anti-democratic, anti-Marxist and anti-liberal. The word "Socialist" was added by the party's executive committee (at the suggestion of Rudolf Jung), over Hitler's initial objections, in order to help appeal to left-wing workers.

In 1920, the Nazi Party officially announced that only persons of "pure Aryan descent []" could become party members and if the person had a spouse, the spouse also had to be a "racially pure" Aryan. Party members could not be related either directly or indirectly to a so-called "non-Aryan". Even before it had become legally forbidden by the Nuremberg Laws in 1935, the Nazis banned sexual relations and marriages between party members and Jews. Some members were even sentenced to death.

Hitler quickly became the party's most active orator, appearing in public as a speaker 31 times within the first year after his self-discovery. Crowds began to flock to hear his speeches. Hitler always spoke about the same subjects: the Treaty of Versailles and the Jewish question. This deliberate technique and effective publicising of the party contributed significantly to his early success, about which a contemporary poster wrote: "Since Herr Hitler is a brilliant speaker, we can hold out the prospect of an extremely exciting evening". Over the following months, the party continued to attract new members, while remaining too small to have any real significance in German politics. By the end of the year, party membership was recorded at 2,000, many of whom Hitler and Röhm had brought into the party personally, or for whom Hitler's oratory had been their reason for joining.

Hitler's talent as an orator and his ability to draw new members, combined with his characteristic ruthlessness, soon made him the dominant figure. However, while Hitler and Eckart were on a fundraising trip to Berlin in June 1921, a mutiny broke out within the party in Munich. Members of its executive committee wanted to merge with the rival German Socialist Party (DSP). Upon returning to Munich on 11 July, Hitler angrily tendered his resignation. The committee members realised that his resignation would mean the end of the party. Hitler announced he would rejoin on condition that he would replace Drexler as party chairman, and that the party headquarters would remain in Munich. The committee agreed, and he rejoined the party on 26 July as member 3,680. Hitler continued to face some opposition within the NSDAP, as his opponents had Hermann Esser expelled from the party and they printed 3,000 copies of a pamphlet attacking Hitler as a traitor to the party. In the following days, Hitler spoke to several packed houses and defended himself and Esser to thunderous applause.

Hitler's strategy proved successful; at a special party congress on 29 July 1921, he replaced Drexler as party chairman by a vote of 533to1. The committee was dissolved, and Hitler was granted nearly absolute powers in the party as its sole leader. He would hold the post for the remainder of his life. Under this principle, the party was a highly centralised entity that functioned strictly from the top down, with Hitler at the apex. Hitler saw the party as a revolutionary organisation, whose aim was the overthrow of the Weimar Republic, which he saw as controlled by the socialists, Jews and the "November criminals", a term invented to describe alleged elements of society who had 'betrayed the German soldiers' in 1918. The SA ("storm troopers", also known as "Brownshirts") were founded as a party militia in 1921 and began violent attacks on other parties.

For Hitler, the twin goals of the party were always German nationalist expansionism and antisemitism. These two goals were fused in his mind by his belief that Germany's external enemies—Britain, France and the Soviet Union—were controlled by the Jews and that Germany's future wars of national expansion would necessarily entail a war of annihilation against them. For Hitler and his principal lieutenants, national and racial issues were always dominant. This was symbolised by the adoption as the party emblem of the swastika. In German nationalist circles, the swastika was considered a symbol of an "Aryan race" and it symbolised the replacement of the Christian Cross with allegiance to a National Socialist State.

The Nazi Party grew significantly during 1921 and 1922, partly through Hitler's oratorical skills, partly through the SA's appeal to unemployed young men, and partly because there was a backlash against socialist and liberal politics in Bavaria as Germany's economic problems deepened and the weakness of the Weimar regime became apparent. The party recruited former World War I soldiers, to whom Hitler as a decorated frontline veteran could particularly appeal, as well as small businessmen and disaffected former members of rival parties. Nazi rallies were often held in beer halls, where downtrodden men could get free beer. The Hitler Youth was formed for the children of party members. The party also formed groups in other parts of Germany. Julius Streicher in Nuremberg was an early recruit and became editor of the racist magazine . Others to join the party around this time were Heinrich Himmler and World War I flying ace Hermann Göring.

Adoption of Italian fascism: The Beer Hall Putsch 
On 31 October 1922, a fascist party with similar policies and objectives came into power in Italy, the National Fascist Party, under the leadership of the charismatic Benito Mussolini. The Fascists, like the Nazis, promoted a national rebirth of their country, as they opposed communism and liberalism; appealed to the working-class; opposed the Treaty of Versailles; and advocated the territorial expansion of their country. Hitler was inspired by Mussolini and the Fascists, beginning to adopt elements of the Fascist's and Mussolini for the Nazi Party and himself. The Italian Fascists also used a straight-armed Roman salute and wore black-shirted uniforms; Hitler would later borrow their use of the straight-armed salute as a Nazi salute.

When the Fascists took control of Italy through their coup d'état called the "March on Rome", Hitler began planning his own coup less than a month later. In January 1923, France occupied the Ruhr industrial region as a result of Germany's failure to meet its reparations payments. This led to economic chaos, the resignation of Wilhelm Cuno's government and an attempt by the German Communist Party (KPD) to stage a revolution. The reaction to these events was an upsurge of nationalist sentiment. Nazi Party membership grew sharply to about 20,000. In this, he was influenced by former General Erich Ludendorff, who had become a supporter—though not a member—of the Nazis.

On the night of 8 November, the Nazis used a patriotic rally in a Munich beer hall to launch an attempted  ("coup d'état"). This so-called Beer Hall Putsch attempt failed almost at once when the local  commanders refused to support it. On the morning of 9 November, the Nazis staged a march of about 2,000 supporters through Munich in an attempt to rally support. Troops opened fire and 16 Nazis were killed. Hitler, Ludendorff and a number of others were arrested and were tried for treason in March 1924. Hitler and his associates were given very lenient prison sentences. While Hitler was in prison, he wrote his semi-autobiographical political manifesto  ("My Struggle").

The Nazi Party was banned on 9 November 1923; however, with the support of the nationalist Völkisch-Social Bloc, it continued to operate under the name "German Party" ( or DP) from 1924 to 1925. The Nazis failed to remain unified in the DP, as in the north, the right-wing Volkish nationalist supporters of the Nazis moved to the new German Völkisch Freedom Party, leaving the north's left-wing Nazi members, such as Joseph Goebbels retaining support for the party.

Rise to power: 1925–1933 

Pardoned by the Bavarian Supreme Court, he was released from prison on 20 December 1924, against the state prosecutor's objections. On 16 February 1925, Hitler convinced the Bavarian authorities to lift the ban on the NSDAP and the party was formally refounded on 26 February 1925, with Hitler as its undisputed leader. The new Nazi Party was no longer a paramilitary organisation and disavowed any intention of taking power by force. In any case, the economic and political situation had stabilised and the extremist upsurge of 1923 had faded, so there was no prospect of further revolutionary adventures. The Nazi Party of 1925 was divided into the "Leadership Corps" appointed by Hitler and the general membership. The party and the SA were kept separate and the legal aspect of the party's work was emphasised. In a sign of this, the party began to admit women. The SA and the SS members (the latter founded in 1925 as Hitler's bodyguard, and known originally as the ) had to all be regular party members.

In the 1920s, the Nazi Party expanded beyond its Bavarian base. Catholic Bavaria maintained its right-wing nostalgia for a Catholic monarch; and Westphalia, along with working-class "Red Berlin", were always the Nazis' weakest areas electorally, even during the Third Reich itself. The areas of strongest Nazi support were in rural Protestant areas such as Schleswig-Holstein, Mecklenburg, Pomerania and East Prussia. Depressed working-class areas such as Thuringia also produced a strong Nazi vote, while the workers of the Ruhr and Hamburg largely remained loyal to the Social Democrats, the Communist Party of Germany or the Catholic Centre Party. Nuremberg remained a Nazi Party stronghold, and the first Nuremberg Rally was held there in 1927. These rallies soon became massive displays of Nazi paramilitary power and attracted many recruits. The Nazis' strongest appeal was to the lower middle-classes—farmers, public servants, teachers and small businessmen—who had suffered most from the inflation of the 1920s, so who feared Bolshevism more than anything else. The small business class was receptive to Hitler's antisemitism, since it blamed Jewish big business for its economic problems. University students, disappointed at being too young to have served in the War of 1914–1918 and attracted by the Nazis' radical rhetoric, also became a strong Nazi constituency. By 1929, the party had 130,000 members.

The party's nominal Deputy Leader was Rudolf Hess, but he had no real power in the party. By the early 1930s, the senior leaders of the party after Hitler were Heinrich Himmler, Joseph Goebbels and Hermann Göring. This was a strictly hierarchical structure in which orders flowed from the top and unquestioning loyalty was given to superiors. Only the SA retained some autonomy. Being composed largely of unemployed workers, many SA men took the Nazis' socialist rhetoric seriously. At this time, the Hitler salute (borrowed from the Italian fascists) and the greeting "Heil Hitler!" were adopted throughout the party.

The Nazis contested elections to the national parliament (the ) and to the state legislature (the ) from 1924, although at first with little success. The "National Socialist Freedom Movement" polled 3% of the vote in the December 1924 Reichstag elections and this fell to 2.6% in 1928. State elections produced similar results. Despite these poor results and despite Germany's relative political stability and prosperity during the later 1920s, the Nazi Party continued to grow. This was partly because Hitler, who had no administrative ability, left the party organisation to the head of the secretariat, Philipp Bouhler, the party treasurer Franz Xaver Schwarz and business manager Max Amann. The party had a capable propaganda head in Gregor Strasser, who was promoted to national organizational leader in January 1928. These men gave the party efficient recruitment and organizational structures. The party also owed its growth to the gradual fading away of competitor nationalist groups, such as the German National People's Party (DNVP). As Hitler became the recognised head of the German nationalists, other groups declined or were absorbed.

Despite these strengths, the Nazi Party might never have come to power had it not been for the Great Depression and its effects on Germany. By 1930, the German economy was beset with mass unemployment and widespread business failures. The Social Democrats and Communists were bitterly divided and unable to formulate an effective solution: this gave the Nazis their opportunity and Hitler's message, blaming the crisis on the Jewish financiers and the Bolsheviks, resonated with wide sections of the electorate. At the September 1930 Reichstag elections, the Nazis won 18% of the votes and became the second-largest party in the  after the Social Democrats. Hitler proved to be a highly effective campaigner, pioneering the use of radio and aircraft for this purpose. His dismissal of Strasser and his appointment of Goebbels as the party's propaganda chief were major factors. While Strasser had used his position to promote his own leftish version of national socialism, Goebbels was completely loyal to Hitler, and worked only to improve Hitler's image.

The 1930 elections changed the German political landscape by weakening the traditional nationalist parties, the DNVP and the DVP, leaving the Nazis as the chief alternative to the discredited Social Democrats and the Zentrum, whose leader, Heinrich Brüning, headed a weak minority government. The inability of the democratic parties to form a united front, the self-imposed isolation of the Communists and the continued decline of the economy, all played into Hitler's hands. He now came to be seen as de facto leader of the opposition and donations poured into the Nazi Party's coffers. Some major business figures, such as Fritz Thyssen, were Nazi supporters and gave generously and some Wall Street figures were allegedly involved, but many other businessmen were suspicious of the extreme nationalist tendencies of the Nazis and preferred to support the traditional conservative parties instead.

During 1931 and into 1932, Germany's political crisis deepened. Hitler ran for president against the incumbent Paul von Hindenburg in March 1932, polling 30% in the first round and 37% in the second against Hindenburg's 49% and 53%. By now the SA had 400,000 members and its running street battles with the SPD and Communist paramilitaries (who also fought each other) reduced some German cities to combat zones. Paradoxically, although the Nazis were among the main instigators of this disorder, part of Hitler's appeal to a frightened and demoralised middle class was his promise to restore law and order. Overt antisemitism was played down in official Nazi rhetoric, but was never far from the surface. Germans voted for Hitler primarily because of his promises to revive the economy (by unspecified means), to restore German greatness and overturn the Treaty of Versailles and to save Germany from communism. On 24 April 1932, the Free State of Prussia elections to the Landtag resulted in 36% of the votes and 162 seats for the NSDAP.

Furthermore, the Nazis and the Communists between them won 52% of the vote and a majority of seats. Since both parties opposed the established political system and neither would join or support any ministry, this made the formation of a majority government impossible. The result was weak ministries governing by decree. Under Comintern directives, the Communists maintained their policy of treating the Social Democrats as the main enemy, calling them "social fascists", thereby splintering opposition to the Nazis. Later, both the Social Democrats and the Communists accused each other of having facilitated Hitler's rise to power by their unwillingness to compromise.

Chancellor Franz von Papen called another  election in November, hoping to find a way out of this impasse. The electoral result was the same, with the Nazis and the Communists winning 50% of the vote between them and more than half the seats, rendering this  no more workable than its predecessor. However, support for the Nazis had fallen to 33.1%, suggesting that the Nazi surge had passed its peak—possibly because the worst of the Depression had passed, possibly because some middle-class voters had supported Hitler in July as a protest, but had now drawn back from the prospect of actually putting him into power. The Nazis interpreted the result as a warning that they must seize power before their moment passed. Had the other parties united, this could have been prevented, but their shortsightedness made a united front impossible. Papen, his successor Kurt von Schleicher and the nationalist press magnate Alfred Hugenberg spent December and January in political intrigues that eventually persuaded President Hindenburg that it was safe to appoint Hitler as Reich Chancellor, at the head of a cabinet including only a minority of Nazi ministers—which he did on 30 January 1933.

Ascension and consolidation 

In Mein Kampf, Hitler directly attacked both left-wing and right-wing politics in Germany. However, a majority of scholars identify Nazism in practice as being a far-right form of politics. When asked in an interview in 1934 whether the Nazis were "bourgeois right-wing" as alleged by their opponents, Hitler responded that Nazism was not exclusively for any class and indicated that it favoured neither the left nor the right, but preserved "pure" elements from both "camps" by stating: "From the camp of bourgeois tradition, it takes national resolve, and from the materialism of the Marxist dogma, living, creative Socialism".

The votes that the Nazis received in the 1932 elections established the Nazi Party as the largest parliamentary faction of the Weimar Republic government. Hitler was appointed as Chancellor of Germany on 30 January 1933.

The Reichstag fire on 27 February 1933 gave Hitler a pretext for suppressing his political opponents. The following day he persuaded the Reich's President Paul von Hindenburg to issue the Reichstag Fire Decree, which suspended most civil liberties. The NSDAP won the parliamentary election on 5 March 1933 with 44% of votes, but failed to win an absolute majority. After the election, hundreds of thousands of new members joined the party for opportunistic reasons, most of them civil servants and white-collar workers. They were nicknamed the "casualties of March" or "March violets". To protect the party from too many non-ideological turncoats who were viewed by the so-called "old fighters"  with some mistrust, the party issued a freeze on admissions that remained in force from May 1933 to 1937.

On 23 March, the parliament passed the Enabling Act of 1933, which gave the cabinet the right to enact laws without the consent of parliament. In effect, this gave Hitler dictatorial powers. Nazi Germany had been established, yet the  remained impartial. Nazi power over Germany remained virtual, not absolute.

After taking power: intertwining of party and state 
During June and July 1933, all competing parties were either outlawed or dissolved themselves and subsequently the Law Against the Formation of Parties of 14 July 1933 legally established the Nazi Party's monopoly. On 1 December 1933, the Law to Secure the Unity of Party and State entered into force, which was the base for a progressive intertwining of party structures and state apparatus. By this law, the SA—actually a party division—was given quasi-governmental authority and their leader became a cabinet minister without portfolio. Effectively, they lost most of their power to the  that were originally just regional divisions of the party, but took over most competencies of the state administration in their respective sectors.

During the Röhm Purge of 30 June to 2 July 1934 (also known as the "Night of the Long Knives"), Hitler disempowered the SA's leadership—most of whom belonged to the Strasserist (national revolutionary) faction within the NSDAP—and ordered them killed. He accused them of having conspired to stage a coup d'état, but it is believed that this was only a pretense to justify the suppression of any intraparty opposition. The purge was executed by the SS, assisted by the Gestapo and Reichswehr units. Aside from Strasserist Nazis, they also murdered anti-Nazi conservative figures like former chancellor von Schleicher. After this, the SA continued to exist but lost much of its importance, while the role of the SS grew significantly. Formerly only a sub-organisation of the SA, it was made into a separate organisation of the NSDAP in July 1934.

The Chancellery of the Führer, officially an organisation of the Nazi Party, took over the functions of the Office of the President (a government agency), blurring the distinction between structures of party and state even further. The  (SD, formally the "Security Service of the Reichsführer-SS") that had been created in 1931 as an intraparty intelligence became the de facto intelligence agency of Nazi Germany. It was put under the Reich Security Main Office (RSHA) in 1939, which then coordinated SD, Gestapo and criminal police, therefore functioning as a hybrid organisation of state and party structures.

Defeat and abolition 
Officially, Nazi Germany lasted only 12 years. The Instrument of Surrender was signed by representatives of the German High Command at Berlin, on 8 May 1945, when the war ended in Europe. The party was formally abolished on 10 October 1945 by the Allied Control Council, followed by the process of denazification along with trials of major war criminals before the International Military Tribunal (IMT) in Nuremberg. Part of the Potsdam Agreement called for the destruction of the Nazi Party alongside the requirement for the reconstruction of the German political life. In addition, the Control Council Law no. 2 Providing for the Termination and Liquidation of the Nazi Organization specified the abolition of 52 other Nazi affiliated and supervised organisations and outlawed their activities. The denazification was carried out in Germany and continued until the onset of the Cold War.

Between 1939 and 1945, the Nazi Party led regime, assisted by collaborationist governments and recruits from occupied countries, was responsible for the deaths of at least eleven million people, including 5.5 to 6 million Jews (representing two-thirds of the Jewish population of Europe), and between 200,000 and 1,500,000 Romani people. The estimated total number includes the killing of nearly two million non-Jewish Poles, over three million Soviet prisoners of war, communists, and other political opponents, homosexuals, the physically and mentally disabled.

Political programme 

The National Socialist Programme was a formulation of the policies of the party. It contained 25 points and is therefore also known as the "25-point plan" or "25-point programme". It was the official party programme, with minor changes, from its proclamation as such by Hitler in 1920, when the party was still the German Workers' Party, until its dissolution.

Party composition

Command structure

Top leadership 

At the top of the Nazi Party was the party chairman (""), who held absolute power and full command over the party. All other party offices were subordinate to his position and had to depend on his instructions. In 1934, Hitler founded a separate body for the chairman, Chancellery of the Führer, with its own sub-units.

Below the Führer's chancellery was first the "Staff of the Deputy Führer", headed by Rudolf Hess from 21 April 1933 to 10 May 1941; and then the "Party Chancellery", headed by Martin Bormann.

Reichsleiter 
They held power and influence comparable to the Reich Ministers' in Hitler's Cabinet. The eighteen  formed the "Reich Leadership of the Nazi Party", which was established at the so-called Brown House in Munich.

Nazi Party offices 
The Nazi Party had a number of party offices dealing with various political and other matters. These included:
  (RPA): "NSDAP Office of Racial Policy"
  (APA): "NSDAP Office of Foreign Affairs"
  (KPA): "NSDAP Office of Colonial Policy"
  (WPA): "NSDAP Office of Military Policy"
  (ARo): "Rosenberg Office"

Paramilitary groups 

In addition to the Nazi Party proper, several paramilitary groups existed which "supported" Nazi aims. All members of these paramilitary organisations were required to become regular Nazi Party members first and could then enlist in the group of their choice. An exception was the Waffen-SS, considered the military arm of the SS and Nazi Party, which during the Second World War allowed members to enlist without joining the Nazi Party. Foreign volunteers of the Waffen-SS were also not required to be members of the Nazi Party, although many joined local nationalist groups from their own countries with the same aims. Police officers, including members of the Gestapo, frequently held SS rank for administrative reasons (known as "rank parity") and were likewise not required to be members of the Nazi Party.

A vast system of Nazi Party paramilitary ranks developed for each of the various paramilitary groups.

The major Nazi Party paramilitary groups were as follows:
  (SS): "Protection Squadron" (both  and Waffen-SS)
  (SA): "Storm Division"
  (NSFK): "National Socialist Flyers Corps"
  (NSKK): "National Socialist Motor Corps"

The Hitler Youth was a paramilitary group divided into an adult leadership corps and a general membership open to boys aged fourteen to eighteen. The League of German Girls was the equivalent group for girls.

Affiliated organisations 
Certain nominally independent organisations had their own legal representation and own property, but were supported by the Nazi Party. Many of these associated organisations were labour unions of various professions. Some were older organisations that were nazified according to the  policy after the 1933 takeover.
 Reich League of German Officials (union of civil servants, predecessor to German Civil Service Federation)
 German Labour Front (DAF)
 National Socialist German Doctors' League
 National Socialist League for the Maintenance of the Law (NSRB, 1936–1945, earlier National Socialist German Lawyers' League)
 National Socialist War Victim's Care (NSKOV)
 National Socialist Teachers League (NSLB)
 National Socialist People's Welfare (NSV)
 Reich Labour Service (RAD)
 German Faith Movement
 German Colonial League (RKB)
 German Red Cross
 Kyffhäuser League
 Technical Emergency Relief (TENO)
 Reich's Union of Large Families
 Reichsluftschutzbund (RLB)
 Reichskolonialbund (RKB)
 Bund Deutscher Osten (BDO)
 German American Bund

The employees of large businesses with international operations such as Deutsche Bank, Dresdner Bank, and Commerzbank were mostly party members. All German businesses abroad were also required to have their own Nazi Party  liaison men, which enabled the party leadership to obtain updated and excellent intelligence on the actions of the global corporate elites.

Regional administration 

For the purpose of centralisation in the  process a rigidly hierarchal structure was established in the Nazi Party, which it later carried through in the whole of Germany in order to consolidate total power under the person of Hitler. The name (originally a term for sub-regions of the Holy Roman Empire headed by a ) for these new provincial structures was deliberately chosen because of its mediaeval connotations. The term is approximately equivalent to the English .

While the Nazis maintained the nominal existence of state and regional governments in Germany itself, this policy was not extended to territories acquired after 1937. Even in German-speaking areas such as Austria, state and regional governments were formally disbanded as opposed to just being dis-empowered.

The establishment of this type of district was subsequently carried out for any further territorial annexations of Germany both before and during World War II. Even the former territories of Prussia were never formally re-integrated into what was then Germany's largest state after being re-taken in the 1939 Polish campaign.

A reorganisation of the Gaue was enacted on 1 October 1928. The given numbers were the official ordering numbers. The statistics are from 1941, for which the Gau organisation of that moment in time forms the basis. Their size and populations are not exact; for instance, according to the official party statistics the Gau Kurmark/Mark Brandenburg was the largest in the German Reich. By 1941, there were 42 territorial Gaue for Greater Germany. Of these, 10 were designated as Reichsgaue: 7 of them for Austria, one for the Sudetenland (annexed from Czechoslovakia) and two for the areas annexed from Poland and the Free City of Danzig after the joint invasion of Poland by Nazi Germany and the Soviet Union in 1939 at the onset of World War II. Getting the leadership of the individual Gaue to co-operate with one another proved difficult at times since there was constant administrative and financial jockeying for control going on between them.

The first table below describes the organizational structure for the Gaue that existed before their dissolution in 1945. Information on former Gaue (that were either renamed, or dissolved by being divided or merged with other Gaue) is provided in the second table.

Nazi Party Gaue 

Later Gaue:
 Flanders, existed from 15 December 1944 (Gauleiter in German exile: Jef van de Wiele)
 Wallonia, existed from 8 December 1944 (Gauleiter in German exile: Léon Degrelle)

Gaue dissolved before 1945 
The numbering is not based on any official former ranking, but merely listed alphabetically.  that were simply renamed without territorial changes bear the designation RN in the column "later became."  that were divided into more than one  bear the designation D in the column "later became."  that were merged with other  (or occupied territory) bear the designation M in the column "together with."

Associated organisations abroad

Gaue in Switzerland 
The irregular Swiss branch of the Nazi Party also established a number of Party  in that country, most of them named after their regional capitals. The  (East Switzerland) combined the territories of three cantons: St. Gallen, Thurgau and Appenzell.

Membership

General membership 

The general membership of the Nazi Party mainly consisted of the urban and rural lower middle classes. 7% belonged to the upper class, another 7% were peasants, 35% were industrial workers and 51% were what can be described as middle class. In early 1933, just before Hitler's appointment to the chancellorship, the party showed an under-representation of "workers", who made up 30% of the membership but 46% of German society. Conversely, white-collar employees (19% of members and 12% of Germans), the self-employed (20% of members and 10% of Germans) and civil servants (15% of members and 5% of the German population) had joined in proportions greater than their share of the general population. These members were affiliated with local branches of the party, of which there were 1,378 throughout the country in 1928. In 1932, the number had risen to 11,845, reflecting the party's growth in this period.

When it came to power in 1933, the Nazi Party had over  members. In 1939, the membership total rose to 5.3 million with 81% being male and 19% being female. It continued to attract many more and by 1945 the party reached its peak of 8 million with 63% being male and 37% being female (about 10% of the German population of 80 million).

Military membership 

Early regulations required that all  members be non-political and any Nazi member joining in the 1930s was required to resign from the Nazi Party.

The British historian Richard J. Evans wrote that junior officers in the army were inclined to be especially zealous National Socialists with a third of them having joined the Nazi Party by 1941. Reinforcing the work of the junior leaders were the National Socialist Leadership Guidance Officers, which were created with the purpose of indoctrinating the troops for the "war of extermination" against Soviet Russia. Among higher-ranking officers, 29% were NSDAP members by 1941.

Student membership 
In 1926, the party formed a special division to engage the student population, known as the National Socialist German Students' League (NSDStB). A group for university lecturers, the National Socialist German University Lecturers' League (NSDDB), also existed until July 1944.

Women membership 
The National Socialist Women's League was the women's organization of the party and by 1938 it had approximately 2 million members.

Membership outside Germany 
The organisation was limited only to so-called "Imperial Germans" (citizens of the German Empire); and "Ethnic Germans", who did not hold German citizenship were not permitted to join.

Under Beneš decree No. 16/1945 Coll., in case of citizens of Czechoslovakia membership of the Nazi Party was punishable by between five and twenty years of imprisonment.

Deutsche Gemeinschaft 
 was a branch of the Nazi Party founded in 1919, created for Germans with  status. It is not to be confused with the post-war right-wing , which was founded in 1949.

Notable members included:
 Oswald Menghin (Vienna)
 Herbert Czaja (Province of Silesia inside Prussia)
 Hermann Neubacher who was responsible for invading Yugoslavia.
 Rudolf Much (Vienna)
 Arthur Seyß-Inquart (Vienna)

Party symbols 
 Nazi flags: The Nazi Party used a right-facing swastika as their symbol and the red and black colours were said to represent  ("blood and soil"). Another definition of the flag describes the colours as representing the ideology of National Socialism, the swastika representing the Aryan race and the Aryan nationalist agenda of the movement; white representing Aryan racial purity; and red representing the socialist agenda of the movement. Black, white and red were in fact the colours of the old North German Confederation flag (invented by Otto von Bismarck, based on the Prussian colours black and white and the red used by northern German states). In 1871, with the foundation of the German Reich the flag of the North German Confederation became the German  ("Reich flag"). Black, white and red became the colours of the nationalists through the following history (for example World War I and the Weimar Republic).
The  design, with the centred swastika disc, served as the party flag from 1920. Between 1933 (when the Nazi Party came to power) and 1935, it was used as the National flag and Merchant flag, but interchangeably with the black-white-red horizontal tricolour. In 1935, the black-white-red horizontal tricolour was scrapped (again) and the flag with the off-centre swastika and disc was instituted as the national flag, and remained as such until 1945.
 German eagle: The Nazi Party used the traditional German eagle, standing atop of a swastika inside a wreath of oak leaves. It is also known as the "Iron Eagle". After the Nazi Party came to national power in Germany, they replaced the traditional version of the German eagle with the modified party symbol throughout the country and all its institutions.

Ranks and rank insignia

Slogans and songs 
 Nazi slogans: ""; ""
 Nazi anthem:

Election results

German Reichstag

Presidential election

Volkstag of Danzig

See also 

 Glossary of Nazi Germany
 List of books about Nazi Germany
 List of Nazi Party leaders and officials
 Mass suicides in 1945 Nazi Germany
 Neo-Nazism
 Sino-German cooperation (1926–1941)
 Socialist Reich Party
 Volkssturm

References
Informational notes

Citations

Bibliography

External links 

 Text of Mein Kampf
 Program of the Nazi Party, its "Manifesto"
  Nationalsozialistische Deutsche Arbeiterpartei (NSDAP) 1920–1933 at Lebendiges Museum Online.
  Nationalsozialistische Deutsche Arbeiterpartei (NSDAP) 1933–1945 at Lebendiges Museum Online.
 Organisationsbuch NSDAP An encyclopedic reference guide to the Nazi Party, organisations, uniforms, flags etc. published by the party itself

 
 
1919 establishments in Germany
1945 disestablishments in Germany

Adolf Hitler
Anti-communist parties
Anti-communism in Germany
Antisemitism in Germany
Banned far-right parties
Banned political parties in Germany
Defunct political parties in Germany
Far-right political parties in Germany
Fascist parties in Germany
The Holocaust
Identity politics
Parties of one-party systems
Political parties established in 1919
Political parties disestablished in 1945
Political parties in the Weimar Republic
Right-wing populism in Germany
Anti-black racism in Germany
Homophobia